Claire Elizabeth Scanlon (born 1971) is an American editor and director. She has been nominated for four Primetime Emmy Awards, winning one, for editing work on The Office and The Apprentice. She won an American Cinema Editors Award in 2014 (for The Office) and was nominated in 2016 (for The Wrecking Crew). She has directed for numerous television shows, including Unbreakable Kimmy Schmidt, The Good Place, Fresh off the Boat, Glow, and Brooklyn Nine-Nine. She made her directorial debut with the Netflix film Set It Up. Scanlon directed the  Unbreakable Kimmy Schmidt interactive special for Netflix. She also directed the comedy-mystery series Mapleworth Murders for Quibi.

References

External links 
 

1971 births
Living people
American women film directors
People from Chicago
American television directors
American television editors
Women television editors
American women television directors
21st-century American women